Philipp Adolf von Ehrenberg (1583–1631) was the Prince-Bishop of Würzburg from 1622 to 1631.

Philipp Adolf von Ehrenberg was born in Heinsheim, which is today a district of Bad Rappenau, on September 23, 1583, the son of Johann Heinrich von Ehrenberg (d. 1584).  His mother was the sister of Julius Echter von Mespelbrunn, who was the Prince-Bishop of Würzburg from 1573 to 1617 and led the massive witch-hunt of Wurzburg alongside his son.

The cathedral chapter of Würzburg Cathedral elected him to be Prince-Bishop of Würzburg on February 6, 1623, with Pope Urban VIII confirming his appointment on March 19, 1624.

As bishop, von Ehrenberg was a fierce supporter of the Counter-Reformation and supported re-Catholicization throughout his territories.  He also oversaw the Würzburg witch trials, a massive witch-hunt in his bishopric from 1626 to 1631, during which time some 900 alleged witches were burned at the stake. 

He died on July 16, 1631.

References

1583 births
1631 deaths
Prince-Bishops of Würzburg